Buxworth railway station was an intermediate stop on the Derby–Manchester line of the Midland Railway. It was open between 1867 and 1958.

History
The Midland Railway (MR) had reached Buxton in 1863. Their next objective was Manchester and, to reach that city, they entered into cooperation with the Manchester, Sheffield and Lincolnshire Railway. The line opened for passenger trains on 1 February 1867 (goods trains already having run for several months). The station at Bugsworth also opened on 1 February 1867.

The station was renamed Buxworth on 4 June 1930.

It closed on 15 September 1958. In 1969 it was bought by Burnage High School in Manchester and was converted for use as an outdoor education centre for school pupils.

References

External links
Buxworth Station on navigable O.S. map

Disused railway stations in Derbyshire
Former Midland Railway stations
Railway stations in Great Britain opened in 1867
Railway stations in Great Britain closed in 1958